The Sierra Railroad Corporation is a privately owned common carrier. Its Sierra Northern Railway freight division handles all freight operations for all branches owned by the Sierra Railroad. The company's Mendocino Railway group operates the diesel- and steam-powered Sacramento RiverTrain (Woodland-Sacramento) and the Skunk Train (Fort Bragg-local).  The company's Sierra Energy division is for energy projects.

History
The similarly named Sierra Railway Company of California was founded in 1897 to connect the California Central Valley to the Gold Country foothills of the Sierra Nevada. Its historic western terminus has always been in Oakdale where a junction was once formed with both the Atchison, Topeka & Santa Fe Railway and the Southern Pacific. The Santa Fe's (now BNSF Railway) Oakdale Branch provided one freight outlet to the AT&SF mainline at Riverbank, California; the Southern Pacific Oakdale Branch from Stockton was abandoned in 1986 and torn out by 1990. The Sierra Railroad bought the BNSF mainline from Riverbank MP1 to Oakdale in 2008.  The portion of the former Sierra Railway conveyed by the railroad's historic owners, the Crocker Family, to the California State Park System are with "Sierra Railway", which preserves the original operating name of the entire line and is headquartered at Railtown 1897 State Historic Park in Jamestown, California.

Beginnings

The Sierra Railway Company of California was incorporated on February 1, 1897 by founders Thomas S. Bullock, Prince André Poniatowski, and William H. Crocker. In May, the first rails were laid in the grain fields just east of Oakdale, and the stops grew to include Occidental (Now called Arnold), Paulsell, Warnerville, Cooperstown, Chinese, and finally on November 8, 1897; Jamestown, California. The railroad owners had no intention of ending the line there, and the line was extended to Tuolumne, some 16 miles from Jamestown. By 1900, the line had been completed, the same as it is today,  with the exception of the abandonment of the Standard to Tuolumne Right-Of-Way. In 1937, the Sierra Railway was sold at a public auction to the new Sierra Railroad Company, and the debts of the original company were settled. In 1955, the railroad made the switch from steam to diesel power, but retained the steam locomotives for movie and television work for which the railroad is famous. In 1971, the Sierra Railroad used its vintage steam locomotives and facilities to its advantage, and opened "Rail Town 1897" as a tourist attraction. In 1979, The Crocker Association, which was the sole owner of the railroad at that time, closed Rail Town and put both the Sierra Railroad and the Jamestown complex with equipment up for sale separately. In 1980, the Sierra Railroad was sold to Silverfoot Inc., and in 1982 the California Department of Parks and Recreation purchased the Jamestown facilities and reopened the site as Railtown 1897 State Historic Park. In 1995, Silverfoot resold the operation to the Sierra Pacific Coast Railway, and in 2003 merged with the Yolo Shortline Railway, as it exists today.

Locomotive roster

See also

California Western Railroad
List of heritage railroads in the United States
Sacramento RiverTrain
Sierra Railway 3

External links

 http://www.sierrarailroad.com
 http://www.sierranorthern.com
 http://www.sacramentorivertrain.com
 http://www.sierradinnertrain.com
 http://www.skunktrain.com
 http://www.sierraenergy.com/
 http://www.railtown1897.org/
 Guide to the Sierra Railroad Records at The Bancroft Library

Heritage railroads in California
Logging railroads in the United States
Defunct California railroads
History of the Sierra Nevada (United States)
Amusement park companies